Kapiniškiai is an ethnographic village in Lithuania. It is located in the Dzūkija National Park south-west of Marcinkonys. According to the 2001 census, it had 54 residents.

Kapiniškiai village is located c.  from Druskininkai,  from Marcinkonys,  from Margionys (the nearest settlement).

References

Ethnographic villages in Lithuania
Villages in Alytus County
Varėna District Municipality